Venilton Torres Teixeira (born on 6 September 1995, Laranjal do Jari) is a taekwondo competitor from Brazil. He won a bronze medal in the 54 kg division at the 2015 world championships and qualified for the 2016 Summer Olympics in the 58 kg weight category.

References

1995 births
Living people
Olympic taekwondo practitioners of Brazil
Brazilian male taekwondo practitioners
Taekwondo practitioners at the 2016 Summer Olympics
Taekwondo practitioners at the 2015 Pan American Games
World Taekwondo Championships medalists
Pan American Games competitors for Brazil